Koduru is a village in Badangi mandal of Vizianagaram district, Andhra Pradesh, India.

Demographics
 Indian census,  Koduru has a population of 5,714; among them males consists of 2,865 and females 2,849.

References

Villages in Vizianagaram district